The crown, originally known as the "crown of the double rose", was an English coin introduced as part of King Henry VIII's monetary reform of 1526, with a value of  of one pound, or five shillings, or 60 pence.

History
The first such coins were minted in 22 carat "crown gold", and the first silver crowns were produced in 1551 during the brief reign of King Edward VI. However, some crowns continued to be minted in gold until 1662. 
No crowns were minted in the reign of Mary I, but silver as well as gold crowns again appeared in the reign of her successor Elizabeth I. Until the time of the Commonwealth of England it was usual for some crowns to be minted in gold as well as in silver, so both versions of the coin can be found for James I and Charles I.

The silver crown was one of a number of European silver coins which first appeared in the 16th century, all of which were of a similar diameter (about 38 millimetres) and weight (approximately one ounce), so were more or less interchangeable in international trade. English silver crowns were minted in all reigns from that of Elizabeth I. The Charles II Petition Crown, engraved by Thomas Simon, is exceptionally rare. 

The composition of the silver crowns was the sterling silver standard of 92.5 per cent silver and 7.5 per cent copper, established in the 12th century by Henry II. This was harder-wearing than fine silver, yet still a high grade. The hardness discouraged the practice of "clipping", and this practice was further discouraged (and largely eliminated) with the introduction of the milled edge.

With the creation of the Kingdom of Great Britain in 1707, the English crown was superseded by the British crown, which is still minted, although since 1990 with a face value of five pounds.

Gallery

References

External links

Coins of England